Mary Nell Steenburgen (born February 8, 1953) is an American actress, comedian, singer, and songwriter. After studying at New York's Neighborhood Playhouse in the 1970s, she made her professional acting debut in 1978 Western comedy film Goin' South. Steenburgen went on to earn critical acclaim for her role in Jonathan Demme's 1980 comedy-drama film Melvin and Howard, for which she received the Golden Globe Award for Best Supporting Actress – Motion Picture and the Academy Award for Best Supporting Actress.

Steenburgen also received nominations for a Golden Globe Award for Miloš Forman's drama film Ragtime (1981), a BAFTA TV Award for the drama miniseries Tender Is the Night (1985), and a Primetime Emmy Award for the television film The Attic: The Hiding of Anne Frank (1988). 

Steenburgen appeared in many television series and also worked as a singer-songwriter for numerous films, in some of which she starred. For her song "Glasgow (No Place Like Home)", which was featured in the musical film Wild Rose (2018), she received the Critics' Choice Movie Award for Best Song.

Early life
Steenburgen was born February 8, 1953, in Newport, Arkansas, to Nellie Mae (née Wall), a school-board secretary, and Maurice Hoffman Steenburgen, a freight-train conductor who worked for the Missouri Pacific Railroad. She has a sister, Nancy Kelly (née Steenburgen), a teacher. 
In 1971, she enrolled at Hendrix College to study drama. She subsequently traveled to Dallas at the suggestion of her drama teacher where she successfully auditioned for New York City's Neighborhood Playhouse.

Career

Early career
Steenburgen moved to Manhattan in 1972 after the Neighborhood Playhouse offered her an opportunity to study acting. She worked as a server at The Magic Pan and for Doubleday while studying under William Esper.

Film career
Steenburgen's break came when she was discovered by Jack Nicholson in the reception room of Paramount Pictures's New York office and was cast as the female lead in his second directorial work, the 1978 Western Goin' South.

Steenburgen had a leading role in the 1979 film Time After Time, for which she won the Saturn Award for Best Actress. She played a modern woman who falls in love with author H. G. Wells, played by Malcolm McDowell, whom she married the following year.

In her third film, she won the Academy Award for Best Supporting Actress for the 1980 film Melvin and Howard. She  played Lynda Dummar, the wife of Melvin Dummar, a trucker and aspiring singer who claimed to have befriended reclusive eccentric Howard Hughes. Another notable film appearance came in the well-received 1983 film Cross Creek, in which she portrayed Marjorie Kinnan Rawlings, author of The Yearling. In 1985, she starred in the film One Magic Christmas as someone who falls on devastating times at Christmas, only to rely on a miracle to save her family. In 1989, she played Karen Buckman in Parenthood. In Back to the Future Part III (1990) Steenburgen played Clara Clayton, a school teacher who falls in love with Doc Brown. She was persuaded to play the role by her children, as well as by fans of the Back to the Future films, and reprised the role by providing the character's voice in Back to the Future: The Animated Series.

Other performances have been in What's Eating Gilbert Grape (1993), as a woman who is having an affair with the title character; My Summer Story (1994), as the mother of Ralphie Parker (the sequel to A Christmas Story); the role of Hannah Nixon in the Oliver Stone biopic, Nixon (1995); and the Will Ferrell 2003 comedy Elf, as a woman who discovers that her husband is the father of one of Santa's elves.

She has appeared in the comedy films Step Brothers (2008), playing the mother of Will Ferrell's character; Four Christmases (2008); and The Proposal (2009).

Dirty Girl, which featured Steenburgen, premiered at the Toronto International Film Festival on September 12, 2010. She also appeared in the critically acclaimed film The Help (2011) and had a featured role as a lounge singer, who is the romantic interest in a love triangle, in the 2013 comedy Last Vegas.

She had a small part in the 2015 film A Walk in the Woods as Jeannie. In 2018, Steenburgen starred in the romantic comedy film Book Club.

Television career
In television, Steenburgen appeared as Kate Montgomery in Ink (1996) and co-starred as Mary Gulliver in Gulliver's Travels (1996). She has a recurring role as herself in Curb Your Enthusiasm. Steenburgen co-starred as Helen Girardi, the mother of Amber Tamblyn's title character in Joan of Arcadia. In 2011, she had a recurring role as Josephine in the HBO sitcom Bored to Death. Steenburgen starred as Anastasia Lee in the 2011 FX pilot Outlaw Country, but it was passed by the network. She appeared in the dark sitcom Wilfred from 2011 through 2013 as Catherine Newman, the title character's eccentric and mentally ill mother. Steenburgen had a recurring role on the NBC sitcom 30 Rock from 2012 to 2013 where she played Diana Jessup.

In 2014, she began a recurring role as former Dixie Mafia boss Katherine Hale in the fifth and sixth seasons of Justified.

From 2015 to 2018, she starred as Gail Klosterman on the comedy series The Last Man on Earth.

From 2020 to 2021, she played the role of Maggie Clarke in the NBC musical comedy-drama series Zoey's Extraordinary Playlist for two seasons. She reprised the role for The Roku Channel television film Zoey's Extraordinary Christmas.

Music career 
In 2007, Steenburgen underwent minor surgery on her arm, which required a general anesthetic; shortly thereafter, she began experiencing "music (...) playing in her head day and night". She subsequently took music lessons so that she could write down what she was hearing, and by 2013 had almost 50 songwriting credits. She has collaborated with musicians from Nashville and was also signed to Universal Music as a songwriter. She performs one of her own songs in Last Vegas.

In 2018, her composition "Glasgow (No Place Like Home)" as performed by Jessie Buckley featured as the climactic musical moment in the film Wild Rose and won Steenburgen several awards, including Critics Choice Award. On October 30, 2020, Steenburgen signed a global publishing deal with Universal Music Publishing Group.

Personal life
In 1978, Steenburgen met and began dating actor Malcolm McDowell while both were co-starring in Time After Time. They married and had two children together, including son Charlie McDowell. They later divorced. On October 7, 1995, Steenburgen married actor Ted Danson, whom she had met on the set of the film Pontiac Moon, and became the stepmother to Danson's two daughters from his previous marriage to producer Cassandra Coates. Steenburgen resides in the Los Angeles area with her family. An alumna of Hendrix College, she received an honorary doctorate from the institution in 1989. In 2006, Steenburgen received an honorary Doctor of Humane Letters degree from Lyon College in Batesville, Arkansas. In September 2005, she and Danson gave a guest lecture for students at the Clinton School of Public Service where they discussed their roles in public service as well as the foundations and causes in which they are involved.

Steenburgen is a friend of former senator and Secretary of State Hillary Clinton and supported, along with Danson, Clinton's 2008 presidential campaign. She spoke at the 2016 Democratic National Convention. Steenburgen is involved with various groups ranging from human rights to environmental causes.

Since 2014, Steenburgen's son Charlie McDowell has had a running joke at her expense, claiming on numerous occasions on social media that his mother is actress Andie MacDowell.

Filmography

Film

Television

Awards and nominations

In addition to these recognitions, Steenburgen received the 1,337th star on Hollywood Walk of Fame on December 16, 2009.

References

External links

 
 
 

1953 births
Living people
20th-century American actresses
21st-century American actresses
Actresses from Arkansas
American film actresses
American people of Dutch descent
American people of English descent
American people of Scottish descent
American people of Welsh descent
American television actresses
Arkansas Democrats
Best Supporting Actress Academy Award winners
Best Supporting Actress Golden Globe (film) winners
Hendrix College alumni
Neighborhood Playhouse School of the Theatre alumni
Outstanding Performance by a Cast in a Motion Picture Screen Actors Guild Award winners
People from Chilmark, Massachusetts
People from Newport, Arkansas
William Esper Studio alumni
Comedians from Arkansas
Comedians from Los Angeles County
California Democrats